The Mbombela Local Municipality is a Local Municipality in Mpumalanga, South Africa. It was formed in 2016 after the merger of the Umjindi Local Municipality and the former Mbombela municipality. The council consists of ninety members elected by mixed-member proportional representation. Forty-five councillors are elected by first-past-the-post voting in forty-five wards, while the remaining twenty are chosen from party lists so that the total number of party representatives is proportional to the number of votes received. In the election of 1 November 2021 the African National Congress (ANC) won a majority of fifty-nine seats.

Results 
The following table shows the composition of the council after past elections.

August 2016 election

The following table shows the results of the 2016 election.

November 2021 election

The following table shows the results of the 2021 election.

References

Mbombela
elections